Collita vetusta is a moth of the  family Erebidae. It is found in Japan (Hokkaido, Honshu, Shikoku, Kyushu, Yakushima), the Russian Far East, northern China and Korea.

The wingspan is 33–38 mm. The ground colour of the wings is whitish testaceous or sometimes brown. The hindwings are paler than the forewings.

Subspecies
Collita vetusta vetusta (Russian Far East, northern China and Korea)
Collita vetusta aegrota (Butler, 1877) (Japan)

References

Moths described in 1854
Lithosiina
Moths of Japan